La Bionda is the fourth studio album by Italian disco duo La Bionda, released in 1978, by Baby Records. It includes the single "One for You, One for Me".

Track listing 

All tracks are written by La Bionda and Richard Palmer-James.

Personnel
Claudia Schwarz, Jerry Rix, Maria Neuhaus, Peter Bishop, Renate Maurer: Choir and Vocals
Freddy Protz, Richard W. Palmer-James: Electric and Acoustic Guitars
Charly Ricanek: Keyboards, Acoustic and Electric Piano, ARP synthesizer
Gary Unwin: Bass
Martin Harrison: Drums, Percussion
Benny Gebauer, Giuseppe Solera: Saxophone
George Delagay, Robert Meisner: Trombone
Ettiene Kut, George Rotzer, Walther Raab: Trumpet
Fritz Sonuleitner and his "Bavarian Strings": String arrangements and conducting

Charts

Weekly charts

References

External links 

 

1978 albums
La Bionda albums
Baby Records albums
Albums produced by La Bionda